Philippe Boënnec (born 21 April 1951 in Nantes) was a member of the National Assembly of France. He represented 
Loire-Atlantique's 9th constituency from 2007 to 2012 as a member of the Union for a Popular Movement.

References

1951 births
Living people
Politicians from Nantes
Union for a Popular Movement politicians
The Social Right
Modern and Humanist France
The Popular Right
Deputies of the 13th National Assembly of the French Fifth Republic